The 2020 Rostelecom Cup was the fifth event in the 2020–21 ISU Grand Prix of Figure Skating, a senior-level international invitational competition series. It was held at Megasport Sport Palace in Moscow, Russia on November 20–22. Medals were awarded in the disciplines of men's singles, ladies' singles, pair skating, and ice dance.

Due to the ongoing COVID-19 pandemic, a large number of modifications were made to the Grand Prix structure. The competitors consisted only of skaters from the home country, skaters already training in the host nation, and skaters assigned to that event for geographic reasons. However, the event became controversial after apparent COVID-19 spread among attendees led to suggestions that it had been a superspreading event.

Entries 
The International Skating Union announced the preliminary assignments on October 1, 2020.

Changes to preliminary assignments

Results

Men

Ladies 

Anna Shcherbakova withdrew prior to the short program due to illness.

Pairs

Ice dance

COVID-19 spread and controversy 

Despite some precautionary measures being taken, the Rostelecom Cup's organization came under criticism for, like many other Russian domestic competitions held during the season, allowing a large audience and insufficient enforcement of mandates regarding social distancing and proper mask usage. A focal point of criticism was the decision to hold the traditional post-competition banquet where many skaters were documented not wearing masks or socially distancing at all, as well as sharing food from a communal buffet; in addition, several skaters who competed at the event were photographed in the following weeks at a birthday party for retired Russian skater Alena Leonova.

Several Russian skaters who competed at the event subsequently reported contracting the virus in the weeks afterward, including Dmitri Aliev, Alena Kostornaia, Elizaveta Tuktamysheva, Victoria Sinitsina, and Nikita Katsalapov. Estonian skater Eva-Lotta Kiibus later also reported contracting COVID-19 at the event and was still suffering effects two months later.

Irina Rodnina, a three-time Olympic pairs champion for Russia and current State Duma member, strongly criticized the handling of the Rostelecom Cup and cited it as an example of the government needing to more aggressively fine people for non-compliance. After the event, an American journalist questioned Jan Dijkema, president of the ISU, whether the Figure Skating Federation of Russia would be sanctioned over their disregard for safety protocols. Dijkema acknowledged "the regrettable news about the situation involving positive test results for COVID-19 of certain Russian Skaters ," but denied the ISU taking responsibility over the situation due to the 2020–21 Grand Prix series' semi-domestic nature.

References 

2020 Rostelecom Cup
2020 in figure skating
2020 in Russian sport
November 2020 sports events in Russia